The William S. Richardson School of Law is the professional graduate law school of the University of Hawaiʻi at Mānoa. Located in Honolulu, Hawaii, the school is named after its patriarch, former Hawaii State Supreme Court Chief Justice William S. Richardson, a zealous advocate of Hawaiian culture, and is Hawaii's only law school.

Richardson's regime of legal studies places special emphasis on fields of law of particular importance to Hawaii and the surrounding Pacific and Asian region, including Native Hawaiian Law, Pacific-Asian Legal Studies, Environmental Law, and maritime law.

A member of the Association of American Law Schools (AALS), the school is accredited by the Council of the Section of Legal Education and Admissions to the Bar of the American Bar Association (ABA). It offers a Juris Doctor, with certificates available in Native Hawaiian Law, Pacific-Asian Legal Studies, and Environmental Law, with students able to matriculate either full-time or part-time. It also offers an Advanced Juris Doctor, for foreign students who have earned a law degree abroad, and a LLM.

For 2021, U.S. News & World Report ranked Richardson 96th among American law schools.  Richardson's part-time program was ranked 30th.

William S. Richardson

The establishment of the Law School in 1973, was considered the achievement of former Hawaii State Supreme Court Chief Justice, William S. Richardson. For many years he had pressed the Hawaii State Legislature for its creation, arguing that the state would benefit by providing a legal education for its residents that enveloped its cultural customs—because they had the greatest stake in constructing the state's legal traditions going forward as such. At his retirement, the Law School was named in his honor.

Ethos

The spirit of Richardson's culture as a community devoted to the study of law is manifested in Kānāwai Māmalahoe, the fundamental precept of Hawaiian law.

Originating in a royal edict by King Kamehameha I in 1797, galvanizing the Kingdom of Hawai'i's legal system, Kānāwai Māmalahoe, or Law of the Splintered Paddle, was enshrined later in the Hawaii State Constitution, Article 9, Section 10.

According to Hawaiian legend, Kānāwai Māmalahoe was declared by King Kamehameha after an incident where he chased two fishermen who were fishing illegally, when he caught his leg in the reef, and one of the fisherman, Kaleleiki, hit him mightily on the head with a paddle in defense, which broke into pieces. Luckily, Kamehameha was able to escape. Years later, when the same fisherman was brought before him to account for the incident, Kamehameha held that in the interest of justice he should be released, as he had only been searching for food for his family.

Reflecting Kānāwai Māmalahoe, the school maintains a "commitment... to a collaborative community that is deeply committed to the... pursuit of social and economic justice" for all. Reflecting this commitment, its unofficial logo is Kaleleiki, the fisherman.

Historical timeline

1970s

1968 – The Hawaii State Legislature established the William S. Richardson School of Law.
1973 – Richardson welcomed its first class of 53 students.
1972 – David Hood appointed Dean.
1974 – The American Bar Association granted William S. Richardson School of Law provisional accreditation.
1976 – Jerome Dupont appointed Acting Dean.
1977 – Cliff Thompson appointed Dean.
1978 – Richardson holds first Ete Bowl.
1979 – University of Hawaii Law Review created.

1980s
1981 – Richard Miller appointed Dean.
1982 – The American Bar Association granted William S. Richardson School of Law full accreditation.
1982 – Richardson sends first Moot Court Team to competition.
1983 – William S. Richardson School of Law moved into new facilities on the campus of the University of Hawaii at Mānoa.
1983 – Richardson Law Library opens.
1983 – Pacific-Asian Legal Studies program begins.
1985 – Jeremy Harrison appointed Dean.
1985 – Student Bar Association Formed.
1987 – Theschool joins United States Supreme Court Jurists-In-Residence Program

1990s
1991 – Elder Law Program formed.
1992 – Environmental Law Certificate established.
1995 – Lawrence Foster appointed Dean.
1995 – Pacific-Asian Legal Studies Certificate established.

2000s
2002 – Law Student Pledge adopted.
2003 – Aviam Soifer appointed dean.
2003 – LLM program started.
2005 – Ka Huli Ao Center for Excellence in Native Hawaiian Law established through a Native Hawaiian Education Act grant.
2005 – Hawaii Innocence Project established.
2008 – Richardson established a part-time evening law program.
2009 – Richardson received a grant from SBS Media Holdings in Seoul, South Korea for $200,000 to establish a Korean Law Faculty Fund.

2010s
2010 – Chief Justice William S. Richardson died on June 21.
2011 – Professor Jon Van Dyke died.
2016 – Dean Jeremy Thomas Harrison died.

Rankings

2016
U.S. News & World Report ranked Richardson 82nd amongst its 142 ranked law  schools. Richardson's part-time program was ranked 30th.

Employment
According to Richardson's official 2013 ABA-required disclosures, 50.9% of the Class of 2013 obtained full-time, long-term, JD-required employment nine months after graduation. Richardson's Law School Transparency under-employment score is 10.2%, indicating the percentage of the class of 2017 unemployed, pursuing an additional degree, or working in a short-term, part-time, or non-professional job nine months after graduation. It is unclear whether the Law School's above-average clerkship placement rate for new graduates is reflected in these numbers.

Costs
The total cost of attendance (indicating the cost of tuition, fees, and living expenses) at the Richardson School of Law for the 2014–2015 academic year is $37,934 for Hawaii residents and $57,662 for non-residents. Law School Transparency has estimated debt-financed cost of attendance for three years is $166,060 for residents and $261,639 for non-residents in 2017.  In July 2016, Richardson was ranked #1 by U.S. News & World Report among American law schools whose alumni have the least debt, at an average of $54,988 for the Class of 2015.

Institutes, programs & centers

Institutes
Institute of Asian-Pacific Business Law. The Institute of Asian-Pacific Business Law was established in June 2006. Its goal is to become an academic center for research and training in the  field of business law in Asia and the Pacific. The Institute focuses on commercial law, insolvency and secured transactions, corporate law and business transactions, securities, intellectual property, real estate financing, and labor law issues. The Institute's activities facilitate direct exchanges between the academic, legal, and business communities in Hawaii and throughout the Asia-Pacific region.
Hammurabi Legal Forum: The Hammurabi Legal Forum for the Rule of Law (HLF) was established in 2008 at the school to aid law schools in Iraq re-invigorate the country's tradition of scholarship. By providing an  online database of free legal resources, HLF originally sought to provide information on issues that are important to Iraq and the Iraqi legal community. In 2009, the HLF expanded its efforts to assist Rule of Law activities in the Kurdistan Region of Iraq. In 2010, it further expanded its research to incorporate additional regions of the globe, including Afghanistan and the Pacific Region, with a special focus on Timor-Leste.

Programs
Hawaii Innocence Project: The Hawaii Innocence Project's mission is to provide pro bono representation to incarcerated persons who have a credible claim of actual innocence.

University of Hawaii Elder Law Program (UHELP): Operating throughout the year, UHELP provides Hawaii's elder community basic legal assistance, advice and information.

Centers
Ka Huli Ao Center for Excellence in Native Hawaiian Law. Established in 2005 through a Native Hawaiian Education Act grant, the Center is an academic center that promotes education, scholarship, community outreach and collaboration on issues of law, culture and justice for Native Hawaiians and other Pacific and Indigenous peoples. The center focuses on education, research and scholarship, community outreach, and the preservation of historical, legal, and traditional and customary materials. It also offers new courses and supports Native Hawaiian and other law students as they pursue legal careers and leadership roles.
Hawaii Health Law Policy Center aims to 1) to conduct and disseminate research on health law policy aimed at improving health care access in Hawaii; 2) to serve as a focus for multidisciplinary research, teaching, on health law and policy in the context of Hawaii; and 3) to bring community leaders, health care policymakers, faculty members, and students together to find solutions to health care shortages and other barriers to access in Hawaii's rural, impoverished, or otherwise underserved communities.

Scholarly publications

University of Hawaii Law Review
The University of Hawaii Law Review is a scholarly legal journal run by students that publishes works by jurists, scholars and practitioners. It publishes two issues annually, and hosts a biennial symposium.

Asian-Pacific Law & Policy Journal
The Asian-Pacific Law and Policy Journalis a biannual peer-reviewed open-access law journal published by the school. It covers issues facing Asia and the Pacific Rim. The journal was established in February 2000, with Jim Hitchingham as editor-in-chief and with assistance and support from Lawrence Foster, Dean of the law school, and professors Ronald Brown and Mark Levin. In addition to its web format, the journal is available through the legal databases LexisNexis and Westlaw.

Visiting tribunals & jurist-in-residence programs

Visiting tribunals

United States Court of Appeals for the Ninth Circuit & Hawaii Supreme Court
Each year, the United States Court of Appeals for the Ninth Circuit sits specially at the school to hear some appeals from the United States District Court for the Districts of Hawaii and Guam. The Hawaii Supreme Court also sits regularly.

Jurist-in-residence programs

Bright International Jurist-in-Residence Program
Started in 2007 under the tutelage of Senior Circuit Judge of the United States Court of Appeals for the Eight Circuit, Myron H Bright, the Bright International Jurist-in-Residence program hosts international jurists to facilitate dialogue with the wider community and the school's faculty and staff.

In 2007, Israel Supreme Court judge Aharon Barak was the visiting scholar. In 2010, the president of the International Court of Justice Hisashi Owada served as visiting scholar.

U.S. Supreme Court Jurist-in-Residence Program
Instituted in 1987, with the support of Myron H. Bright, a Senior Circuit Judge for the United States Court of Appeals for the Eight Circuit, Richardson has a U.S. Supreme Court Jurist-In-Residence Program.  Biannually, a visiting U.S. Supreme Court Justice presents seminars on current judicial issues as well as teaches classes.

Faculty

Endowed professorship & faculty chairs
Through the University of Hawaii at Manoa Foundation, Richardson has been endowed with several professorships and faculty chairs.

Benjamin A. Kudo Professor of Law
Dan & Maggie Inouye Distinguished Chair In Democratic Ideas
Fred T. Korematsu Professorship In Law and Social Justice
George J Johnson Visiting Professor Endowment
Michael J. Marks Distinguished Professor of Business Law
Wallace S. Fujiyama Distinguished Visiting Professor of Law
Carlsmith Ball Faculty Scholar Fund
SBS Holdings Co. Korean Faculty Fund

Notable faculty 
In 2013,The Princeton Review ranked the Richardson faculty as the third "Most Diverse Faculty." And, in 2012, U.S. News & World Report ranked the school 3rd of 190 Law Schools for "Smallest Faculty-Student Ratio". The faculty is specialized in an array of legal areas.

Current notable faculty:
David L. Callies, Scholar of the Law of Real Property
Tae-Ung Baik, Former Korean Prisoner of Conscience, Specialist in International Human Rights Law and Korean Law
Mari Matsuda, Activist legal scholar, lawyer, first tenured Female Asian-American law professor
Randall Roth
Richard W. Pollack
Aviam Soifer, Constitutional law scholar, former Dean of Boston College Law School
Eric Yamamoto, Korematsu Professor of Law and Social Justice,

Former faculty
Chris Iijima, Legal scholar, Asian-American civil rights activist, folk singer (Deceased)
Jon Van Dyke, Constitutional law scholar, lawyer, activist (Deceased)

Students

Student body
In 2013, U.S. News & World Report ranked the school 25th of 190 Law Schools for "Most Selective". In addition, Richardson is recognized for its highly diverse student body. In 2013, U.S. News & World Report ranked it 1st of 190 Law Schools for "Diversity Index," while Princeton Review ranked it "Best Environment for Minority Students."

Law student pledge
Adopted in 2002 as an aspirational reflection of Kānāwai Māmalahoe, all Richardson students recite the William S. Richardson School of Law Law Student Pledge, written by late Professor Chris Iijima, before a  Hawaii Supreme Court Justice during a special ceremony before they begin their legal education.

The Pledge is:

In the study of law, I will conscientiously prepare myself;

To advance the interests of those I serve before my own,

To approach my responsibilities and colleagues with integrity, professionalism, and civility,

To guard zealously legal, civil and human rights which are the birthright of all people,

And, above all,

To endeavor always to seek justice.

This I do pledge.

Student organizations
Richardson sponsors numerous student organizations, including:

'Ahahui O Hawai'i
Advocates For Public Interest Law (APIL)
American Inns of Court (The Hon. James S. Burns Aloha Chapter of the Inns of Court)
American Bar Association-Student Chapter
Black Law Student Association (BLSA)
Christian Legal Society (CLS)
Delta Theta Phi Legal Fraternity (DTP)
Environmental Law Society (ELS)

Federalist Society
Federal Bar Association Hawaii Law Student Division
Filipino Law School Association (FLSA)
Hammurabi Legal Forum
Hawaii Women's Lawyers
La Alianza
Lambda Law Student Association
Pacific-Asian Legal Studies Organization (PALSO)
Phi Delta Phi International Legal Fraternity
Richardson Golf Association
Running Group
Self Defense Club
Soccer Club
Street Law
Student Animal League Defense Fund (SALDF)
Student Bar Association (SBA)
Students With Keiki
Sustainable Richardson
TED Richardson

Moot Court teams

Richardson fields Moot Court teams, composed of students, in competitions across many legal areas. In addition, Richardson fields a competitive Client Counseling Team.

Moot court teams
Environmental Moot Court Team
Hispanic Moot Court Team
Saul Lefkowtiz Intellectual Property Moot Court Team
International Environmental Moot Court Team
International Negotiations Team
Mock Trial Team
Native American Moot Court Team
Philip C. Jessup International Law Moot Court Competition Team
Robert F. Wagner Labor & Employment Law Moot Court Team
Space Law Moot Court Team

Law school traditions

A list of some of Richardson's traditions:
Student Pledge
Adopted in 2002 as an aspirational reflection of Kānāwai Māmalahoe, all Richardson students recite the Law Student Pledge, written by late Professor Chris Iijima, before a Hawaii Supreme Court Justice during a special ceremony before they begin their legal education.
Ete Bowl

Starting in 1978, Richardson—in a tradition that promotes school spirit and camaraderie amongst students—holds a yearly alumnae v. female law students flag football game. The Alumnae ("Bruzers") and UH Law Student ("Etes") teams are composed entirely of female students, while cheerleaders are composed of male students dressed in drag. 
Stew Day
Begun by Professor Calvin Pang, every year on Stew Day, the Richardson Faculty dress up in goofy hats and aprons and serve a stew lunch to the students. Recently added to Stew Day, Professor Pang orchestrated the "Red Socks Award" – in honor of Dean Aviam Soifer, a Boston Red Sox Fan. H

Notable alumni
Politics

Colleen Hanabusa, US Congressional Representative
Florence T. Nakakuni, United States Attorney for the District of Hawaii
John D. Waihee III, Former Hawaii Governor
Duke Aiona, 10th Lieutenant Governor of Hawaii
Earl I. Anzai, Former Hawaii State Attorney General
Brian Taniguchi, Hawaii State Senator
Dwight Takamine, Hawaii State Senator
Blake Oshiro, Majority Leader, Hawaii House of Representatives
Quentin Kawānanakoa, Minority Leader Hawaii, House of Representatives
Della Au Belatti, Hawaii House of Representatives
Sharon Har, Hawaii House of Representatives
Scott Nishimoto, Hawaii House of Representatives
Maile Shimabukuro, Hawaii House of Representatives
Kirk Caldwell, Mayor of Honolulu, Hawaii
Billy Kenoi, Mayor of Hawaii Island
Doug Chin, 14th Attorney General of Hawaii and 13th Lieutenant Governor of Hawaii

Judiciary

Sabrina McKenna, Hawaii Supreme Court Justice, Lawyer

Academia

Noelle Kahanu
Mari Matsuda

Crime

Katherine Kealoha, former Honolulu deputy prosecutor and convicted felon

References

External links
William S. Richardson School of Law

1973 establishments in Hawaii
Buildings and structures in Honolulu County, Hawaii
Education in Honolulu County, Hawaii
Educational institutions established in 1973
Law schools in Hawaii
University of Hawaiʻi